Adriano da Silva is a name. People with that name include:

 Adriano Peixe, Brazilian footballer, full name Adriano da Silva
 Adriano (footballer, born August 1999), Brazilian footballer, full name Adriano da Silva Barros Junior
 Adriano da Silva (sailor), Portuguese sailor

Da Silva, Adriano